While New York Sleeps is a 1938 American crime film directed by H. Bruce Humberstone and written by Frances Hyland and Albert Ray. The film stars Michael Whalen, Jean Rogers, Chick Chandler, Robert Kellard, Joan Woodbury, Harold Huber and Marc Lawrence. The film was released on January 6, 1939, by 20th Century Fox.

Plot

Cast    
Michael Whalen as Barney Callahan
Jean Rogers as Judy King
Chick Chandler as Snapper Doolan
Robert Kellard as Malcolm Hunt
Joan Woodbury as Nora Parker
Harold Huber as Joe Marco
Marc Lawrence as Happy Nelson
Sidney Blackmer as Ralph Simmons
William Demarest as Red Miller
June Gale as Kitty
Cliff Clark as Police Insp. Cliff Collins
Edward Gargan as Police Sgt. White
Minor Watson as Charles MacFarland
Robert Middlemass as James Sawyer

References

External links
 

1938 films
1930s English-language films
American crime films
1938 crime films
20th Century Fox films
Films directed by H. Bruce Humberstone
American black-and-white films
1930s American films